The ochraceous attila (Attila torridus) is a species of bird in the family Tyrannidae.
It is found in Colombia, Ecuador, and Peru.
Its natural habitats are subtropical or tropical moist lowland forests and plantations .
It is threatened by habitat loss.

References

External links
BirdLife Species Factsheet.

Attila (genus)
Birds described in 1860
Taxonomy articles created by Polbot